The Battle of Sacheon (泗川) was a siege by Korean and Chinese forces against the Japanese fortification of Sacheon from 6 to 11 November 1598. It ended in Japanese victory.

Background
Dong Yiyuan and Jeong Chaeryong's combined army pushed forward to Sacheon on 6 November 1598.

Battle
On 6 November the allied forces surrounded the fortress.

On 9 November the allies assaulted the fortress, bombarding it as well as using a ram to smash the gate.

On 11 November the allies breached the walls and as they were pushing into it, an explosion occurred. The cause of the explosion is uncertain, but the result is that the shockwave caused a massive rout which led to heavy casualties.

References

Bibliography

 
 
 
 
 
 
 
 
 
 
 桑田忠親 [Kuwata, Tadachika], ed., 舊參謀本部編纂, [Kyu Sanbo Honbu], 朝鮮の役 [Chousen no Eki]　(日本の戰史 [Nihon no Senshi] Vol. 5), 1965.
 
 
 
 
 
 
 
 
 
 
 
 
  
 
 
 
 
 
 

Battles of the Japanese invasions of Korea (1592–1598)
Sieges involving Japan
Sieges involving Korea
1598 in Korea
Conflicts in 1598